József Egry (1883–1951) was a Hungarian painter, considered a significant representative of Hungarian modernism.

Life
Egry was a student of Janos Korcsek, Károly Ferenczy, and Pál Szinyei Merse He also studied in  Munich and Vienna in 1904 and at the Académie Julian in Paris in 1905. He continued his studies in Brussels. Egry's works were Expressionist and Constructivist in nature. He was called as painter of Lake Balaton.

References

Sources 

1883 births
1951 deaths
20th-century Hungarian painters
Académie Julian alumni
Hungarian male painters
20th-century Hungarian male artists